Michel Van den Bergh (born 25 July 1960) is a Belgian mathematician and professor at the Vrije Universiteit Brussel and does research at the Universiteit Hasselt. His research interest is on the fundamental relationship between algebra and geometry. In 2003, he was awarded the Francqui Prize on Exact Sciences.

External links
 
 Publications of Michel Van den Bergh

Belgian mathematicians
Academic staff of Vrije Universiteit Brussel
Living people
1960 births